Zaireichthys zonatus is a species of loach catfish endemic to the Democratic Republic of the Congo where it is found in the rapids just below Pool Malebo.  It grows to a length of 2.5 cm.  Its body has vertical bands with darkened margins.  The humeral process of the pectoral girdle is short and with a few fine denticulations at its tips.  The dorsal and pectoral fins have strong and stout spines.  Z. zonatus is found only at the edges of a sandy areas, although their habitat is very rocky.

References 
 

Amphiliidae
Fish of Africa
Endemic fauna of the Democratic Republic of the Congo
Fish described in 1967